In the United States, the war on coal is a phrase used by the coal industry and its supporters to describe what they claim was an effort by the Obama administration to impose stringent regulations on coal power in the United States and thereby make such power uneconomical. Proponents of this phrase also often identify the Environmental Protection Agency as one of the chief entities waging this putative war, although Michael Grunwald has claimed that the war on coal, although real, does not primarily happen at the national level but at the state and local level, and that the "boots on the ground" in the war are lawyers from the Sierra Club's Beyond Coal campaign. During Obama's tenure, the Obama administration denied that they were waging a war on coal, noting the possibility of upgrading older power plants with more efficient turbines, and also pointing to the possibility of carbon sequestration techniques.

On March 28, 2017, in announcing an executive order aimed at revoking various rules regarding carbon emissions enacted during the Obama administration, President Donald Trump stated that "Our administration is putting an end to the war on coal."

On October 9, 2017, Trump's Environmental Protection Agency chief, Scott Pruitt reiterated "the war against coal is over" while announcing a move to repeal a rule on greenhouse gas emissions.

References

Energy policy of the United States
Coal in the United States
Metaphors referring to war and violence
United States federal policy
Obama administration controversies